Keith Swanick is an Irish former Fianna Fáil politician who served as a Senator for the Cultural and Educational Panel from 2016 to 2020.

Early life and education
Originally from Castlerea in County Roscommon, Swanick and his wife run a GP Practice in Belmullet in the Erris region of North Mayo. He is also the Secretary of the National Association of Irish General Practitioners.

Career
He was chosen as a candidate for Fianna Fáil in a Seanad by-election after the retirement of Jimmy Harte, which was won by Labour's Máiría Cahill. He initially considered contesting the 2016 general election in the Roscommon-Galway constituency but declined.

He was the Fianna Fáil Seanad Spokesperson on Health and Mental Health.

He did not contest the 2020 Seanad election, after being involved in an Oireachtas expenses controversy.

References

Living people
Alumni of the University of Galway
Alumni of the Royal College of Surgeons in Ireland
Fianna Fáil senators
Members of the 25th Seanad
21st-century Irish medical doctors
Year of birth missing (living people)